Dulcina de Moraes (February 3, 1908 in Valença — August 28, 1996 in Brasília) was a Brazilian stage actress and director. Founder of the Fundação Brasileira de Teatro, it was later renamed the Faculty of Arts Dulcina de Moraes, in Brasilia. She married Odilon Azevedo in 1931. As producer she took part in only one act, Ninotchka (1951).

Life and career
Dulcina de Moraes was the daughter of two great actors of the time, Átila and Conchita de Moraes. Her name was a tribute to her maternal grandmother Dulcina Los Rios Vallina, who was an actress as well. At the age of only one month, Dulcina was already on a scene occupying a cradle instead of a doll. At the age of 15 she debuted at Teatro Trianon in the show Travessuras de Berta, through Companhia Brasileira de Comédia.

In 1925, Dulcina was invited by Leopoldo Fróes, owner of one of the most important theatrical companies of the time, taking the leading role (Jeannine) of stage act Lua Cheia, directed by André Birabeau. Five years later, on July 4, 1930, she married actor and writer Odilon Azevedo. In 1934, together with her husband, she founded Cia. Dulcina-Odilon, responsible for memorable hits on the national theatrical scene. Her company was the first to present to the Brazilian public authors such as García Lorca (Bodas de Sangue), D’Annunzio (A Filha de Iório), Bernard Shaw (César e Cleópatra, Santa Joana, Pigmaleão) and Jean Giraudoux (Anfitrião 38).

She received the Medal of Merit as best actress of the year for lifetime achievement in 1949 from Associação Brasileira de Críticos Teatrais (ABCT). In the movies, she had only one role in the film 24 Horas de Sonho (1941).

In 1955, Dulcina founded the Fundação Brasileira de Teatro, devoting herself entirely to her foundation, first in the building where today the theater that bears her name is located, downtown Rio de Janeiro, and later, in 1972, in Brasilia, forming hundreds of actors. That same year she transferred her foundation to Brasilia, finally moving to the capital in 1981. On April 21 of that year, she opened the Teatro Dulcina, in Brasilia, and on September 18, 1980, the art college Faculdade de Artes Dulcina de Moraes.

Dulcina de Moraes died on August 28, 1996, in Brasilia.

Legacy
Brazilian authors also had their turn in the repertoire of Dulcina de Moraes, as Viriato Correia  (A Marquesa de Santos), Raimundo Magalhães Júnior (O Imperador Galante) e Maria Jacintha (Convite à Vida, Conflito, Já é Manhã no Mar), among many others .

Theatre work

Actress

Director

See also
 List of people on stamps of Brazil

References

External links

1908 births
1996 deaths
Actresses from Rio de Janeiro (city)
Brazilian stage actresses
Brazilian theatre directors
20th-century Brazilian actresses